Sundanese (: , ; Sundanese script: ᮘᮞ ᮞᮥᮔ᮪ᮓ;) is a Malayo-Polynesian language spoken by the Sundanese. It has approximately 40 million native speakers in the western third of Java; they represent about 15% of Indonesia's total population.

Classification
According to American linguist Robert Blust, Sundanese is closely related to the Malayic languages, as well as to language groups spoken in Borneo such as the Land Dayak languages or the Kayan–Murik languages, based on high lexical similarities between these languages.

History and distribution 

Sundanese is mainly spoken on the west side of the island of Java, in an area known as Tatar Sunda (Pasundan). However, Sundanese is also spoken in the western part of Central Java, especially in Brebes and Cilacap Regency, because these areas were previously under the control of the Galuh Kingdom. Many place names in Cilacap are still Sundanese names such as Dayeuhluhur, Cimanggu, Cipari and so on.

Until 1600 AD, Sundanese was the state language in the kingdoms of Salakanagara, Tarumanagara, Sunda, Galuh, and Pajajaran. During this period, Sundanese was heavily influenced by the Sanskrit language as seen in the Batu Tapak Kaki Kiri Nyoreang inscription at the time of King Purnawarman, using the Pallava script. Sundanese at that time was used in the fields of state, art, and daily life, many religious books were written in Sundanese and used Old Sundanese script such as the Sanghyang Siksa Kandang Karesian Manuscript, Carita Parahyangan, Amanat Galunggung, and Guru Talapakan.

In addition, according to some Sundanese language experts until around the 6th century, the area of speech reached around the Dieng Plateau in Central Java, based on the name "Dieng" which is considered the name Sundanese (from the origin of the word dihyang which is an Old Sundanese word). Along with transmigration and immigration carried out by the Sundanese ethnics, speakers of this language have spread beyond the island of Java. For example, in Lampung, South Sumatra, Jambi, Riau, West Kalimantan, Southeast Sulawesi and even outside the country of Indonesia, such as Taiwan, Japan, Australia and other countries, a significant number of ethnic Sundanese live in areas outside the Pasundan.

Dialects

Sundanese has several dialects, conventionally described according to the locations of the people:

Western dialect, spoken in the provinces of Banten and some parts of Lampung;
Northern dialect, spoken in Bogor, and northwestern coastal areas of West Java;
Southern or Priangan dialect, spoken in Sukabumi, Sumedang, Cianjur, Bandung, Garut and Tasikmalaya
Mid-east dialect, spoken in Cirebon, Majalengka and Indramayu,
Northeast dialect, spoken in Kuningan, and Brebes (Central Java),
Southeast dialect, spoken in Ciamis, Pangandaran, Banjar and Cilacap (Central Java).

The Priangan dialect, which covers the largest area where Sundanese people lives (Parahyangan in Sundanese), is the most widely spoken type of Sundanese language, taught in elementary till senior-high schools (equivalent to twelfth-year school grade) in West Java and Banten Province.

Writing

The language has been written in different writing systems throughout history. The earliest attested documents of the Sundanese language were written in the Old Sundanese script (Aksara Sunda Kuno). After the arrival of Islam, the Pegon script is also used, usually for religious purposes. The Latin script then began to be used after the arrival of Europeans. In modern times, most of Sundanese literature is written in Latin. The regional government of West Java and Banten are currently promoting the use of Standard Sundanese script (Aksara Sunda Baku) in public places and road signs. The Pegon script is still used mostly by pesantrens (Islamic boarding school) in West Java and Banten or in Sundanese Islamic literature.

Phonology
Sundanese orthography is highly phonemic (see also Sundanese script).

Vowels 

Consonants 
The consonantal phonemes are transcribed with the letters p, b, t, d, k, g, c , j , h, ng, ny , m, n, s , w, l, r , and y .
Other consonants that originally appear in Indonesian loanwords are mostly transferred into native consonants: f/v  → p, sy  → s, z  → j, and kh  → h.

 kuéh - 
 muih - 
 béar - 
 miang -

Register
Sundanese has an elaborate system of register distinguishing levels of formality. At the beginning of speech level development, it was known 6 levels of Sundanese language: basa kasar (rough), sedeng (medium), lemes (polite), lemes pisan (very polite), kasar pisan (very rough), and basa panengah (intermediate). But since the 1988 Congress of Sundanese Language in Bogor, the speech level has been narrowed to only two parts: basa hormat (respectful) and basa loma (fair). Besides that, the term was changed to "tatakrama basa", although the substance remained the same. The hormat variant is a subtle language to respect, while the loma variant is fair, neutral and familiar use. This variety of loma language is then used as a kind of "standard" variety of written languages in Sundanese society. Sundanese magazines, newspapers, literary books and theses, mostly using the loma variant. 

Apart from the two previous levels, there is actually one more lowest level, namely cohag (rough). This level is only used when angry or just to show intimacy between speakers. This register can only be found in the Sundanese Priangan dialect, while other dialects such as Bantenese Language, generally do not recognize this register.

For many words, there are distinct loma and lemes forms, e.g. arék (loma) vs. badé (lemes) "want", maca (loma) vs. maos (lemes) "read". In the lemes level, some words further distinguish humble and respectful forms, the former being used to refer to oneself, and the latter for the addressee and third persons, e.g. rorompok "(my own) house" vs. bumi "(your or someone else's) house" (the loma form is imah).

Similar systems of speech levels are found in Japanese, Korean and Thai.

Basic vocabulary

Pronoun

Numeral

Grammar

Root word

Root verb

Plural form
Other Austronesian languages commonly use reduplication to create plural forms. However, Sundanese inserts the ar infix into the stem word. If the stem word starts with l, or contains r following the infix, the infix ar becomes al. Also, as with other Sundanese infixes (such as um), if the word starts with vowel, the infix becomes a prefix. 
Examples: 
Mangga A, tarahuna haneut kénéh. "Please sir, the bean curds are still warm/hot." The plural form of tahu 'bean curd, tofu' is formed by infixing ar after the initial consonant. 
Barudak leutik lalumpatan. "Small children running around." Barudak "children" is formed from budak (child) with the ar infix; in lumpat (run) the ar infix becomes al because lumpat starts with l.
Ieu kaén batik aralus sadayana. "All of these batik clothes are beautiful." Formed from alus (nice, beautiful, good) with the infix ar that becomes a prefix because alus starts with a vowel. It denotes the adjective "beautiful" for the plural subject/noun (batik clothes).
Siswa sakola éta mah balageur. "The students of that school are well-behaved." Formed from bageur ("good-behaving, nice, polite, helpful") with the infix ar, which becomes al because of r in the root, to denote the adjective "well-behaved" for plural students.

However, it is reported that this use of al instead of ar (as illustrated in (4) above) does not to occur if the 'r' is in onset of a neighbouring syllable. For example, the plural form of the adjective curiga (suspicious) is caruriga and not *caluriga, because the 'r' in the root occurs at the start of the following syllable.
 
The prefix can be reduplicated to denote very-, or the plural of groups. For example, "bararudak" denotes many, many children or many groups of children (budak is child in Sundanese). Another example, "balalageur" denotes plural adjective of "very well-behaved".

Active form
Most active forms of Sundanese verbs are identical to the root, as with diuk "sit" or dahar "eat". Some others depend on the initial phoneme in the root:

Negation

Polite:

 Abdi teu acan neda. "I have not eaten yet."
 Buku abdi mah sanés nu ieu. "My book is not this one."
Formal:

 Kuring acan dahar. "I have not eaten yet."
 Buku kuring mah lain nu ieu. "My book is not this one."

Question

Dupi (for polite situation)/Ari (for formal situation)-(question)

example:

Polite:

 Dupi Tuang Rama nyondong di bumi? "Is your father at home?"
 Dupi bumi di palih mana? "Where do you live?"
Formal:

Ari Bapa aya di imah? "Is your father at home?"
 Ari imah di beulah mana? "Where do you live?"

Interrogatives

Passive form

Polite:
Buku dibantun ku abdi. "The book is brought by me." Dibantun is the passive form ngabantun "bring".
Pulpén ditambut ku abdi. "The pen is borrowed by me."
Soal ieu dipidamel ku abdi. "This problem is done by me."
Kacasoca dianggo ku abdi.  "Glasses worn by me."
Formal:
Buku dibawa ku urang. "The book is brought by me." Dibawa is the passive form mawa "bring".
Pulpén diinjeum ku urang. "The pen is borrowed by me."
Soal ieu digawékeun ku urang. "This problem is done by me."
Tasma dipaké ku urang.  "Glasses worn by me."

Adjectives

Examples:

teuas (hard), tiis (cool for water and solid objects), tiris (cool for air), hipu (soft), lada (hot/spicy, usually for foods), haneut (warm), etc.

Prepositions

Place
Sundanese has three generic prepositions for spatial expressions:
 di: 'in', 'at' etc., indicating position
dina/na: 'on', 'at' etc., indicating specific position
 ka: 'to', indicating direction
 kana: 'to', indicating specific direction
 ti: 'from', indicating origin
tina: 'from', indicating specific origin

To express more specific spatial relations (like 'inside', 'under' etc.), these prepositions have been combined with locative nouns:

Di gigir/luhur/handap/tukang/hareup (also ka gigir, ti gigir etc.) are absolute adverial expressions without a following noun. To express relative position, they have to add the suffix -eun, e.g.:

Polite:
di luhur bumi – 'on top of the house'
dina luhur lomari – 'on top of the cupboard'
ti pengker bumi – 'from behind the house'
tina pengker lomari – 'from behind the cupboard'
Formal:
di luhureun imah – 'on top of the house'
dina luhureun lomari – 'on top of the cupboard'
ti tukangeun imah – 'from behind the house'
tina tukangeun lomari – 'from behind the cupboard'
Di jero, di luar and the polite forms luhur & pengker can be used both with and without a following noun.

Time

Miscellaneous

See also
Sundanese alphabet
 Sundanese (Unicode block)

References

Bibliography

Further reading

External links

 Sundanese-Indonesian and Indonesian-Sundanese Dictionary
 Sundanese converter Latin-Sudanese script (Aksara Sunda)
 Indonesian-Sundanese Translator
 Sundanese - Unicode Character Table
 Sundanese Christian song - an example from Sanggar Mekar Asih

 
Subject–verb–object languages
Greater North Borneo languages
Agglutinative languages